Nerodimka may refer to:

Nerodimka Mountain, a mountain in south Kosovo
Nerodimka (river), a river in Kosovo